KRI Banda Aceh (593) is the fourth ship of the Makassar-class landing platform dock of the Indonesian Navy.

Development and design 

Indonesia signed a US$150 million contract in December 2004 and the first two units were built in Busan, South Korea. The remaining two were built at Indonesia's PT PAL shipyard in Surabaya with assistance from Daesun.The contract for the 3rd and 4th LPD to be built in Indonesia was signed with PT PAL on March 28, 2005.

On 19 October 2006, the first of the two Indonesian-built units, was laid down in a ceremony by Admiral Slamet Subiyanto, Chief of Staff, Indonesian Navy. The 3rd and 4th units had been designed to function as flagships with provisions for a command and control system, 57mm gun and air defence systems.

The 5th ship ordered by Indonesian navy on January 11, 2017. First steel cutting ceremony for said ship was conducted on April 28, 2017. The ship's keel was laid on August 28. 2017.

Construction and career
Banda Aceh was laid down 7 December 2007 and launched on 19 March 2010 by PT PAL at Surabaya. She was commissioned on 21 March 2011.

She participated in RIMPAC 2014.

Gallery

References

== External links ==

2010 ships
Ships built in Indonesia
Amphibious warfare vessels of the Indonesian Navy
Makassar-class landing platform docks